This is a listing of the horses that finished in either first, second, or third place and the number of starters in the Louisiana Derby, an American Grade 2 race for three-year-olds at 1-1/8 miles on dirt held at Fair Grounds Race Course in New Orleans, Louisiana.  (List 1973–present)

See also 

Louisiana Derby

References

External links
 The Louisiana Derby at Pedigree Query
 The Louisiana Derby at the NTRA

Fair Grounds Race Course
Lists of horse racing results
Triple Crown Prep Races
Horse races in New Orleans
Horse racing